Lowell Wilson MacDonald (born August 30, 1941) is a Canadian former professional National Hockey League winger who played during the 1960s and 1970s.

Career
MacDonald broke into the NHL with the Detroit Red Wings after being promoted from the AHL's Pittsburgh Hornets. He spent two years with the Los Angeles Kings, but was most productive with the Pittsburgh Penguins where he was awarded the Bill Masterton Memorial Trophy in 1973. MacDonald retired after 506 games, recording 180 goals, 210 assists, 390 points, and only 92 penalty minutes.

Career statistics

Awards
OHA-Jr. First All-Star Team (1962) 
Bill Masterton Memorial Trophy (1973)
NHL All-Star Game (1973, 1974)

Transactions
 May 20, 1965 – Traded to Toronto by Detroit with Marcel Pronovost, Eddie Joyal, Larry Jeffrey and Aut Erickson for Andy Bathgate, Billy Harris and Gary Jarrett.
 June 6, 1967 – Claimed by Los Angeles from Toronto in 1967 NHL Expansion Draft.
 June 9, 1970 – Claimed by Pittsburgh from Los Angeles in an Intra-League Draft.
 October 21, 1970 – Missed majority of 1970-71 and entire 1971-72 due to knee injury vs. Los Angeles.
 December 10, 1975 – Missed majority of 1976-77 and 1977-78 due to shoulder injury originally vs. Detroit.

External links
 

1941 births
Bill Masterton Memorial Trophy winners
Canadian ice hockey defencemen
Canadian people of Scottish descent
Detroit Red Wings players
Hamilton Tiger Cubs players
Hamilton Red Wings (OHA) players
Ice hockey people from Nova Scotia
Living people
Los Angeles Kings players
People from Pictou County
Pittsburgh Hornets players
Pittsburgh Penguins players
Rochester Americans players
Springfield Kings players